Fredrik Näslund (born February 11, 1986, in Bromma, Sweden) is a Swedish ice hockey player who plays for the Falu IF in Div.1C.

Näslund, who now lives in Falun, was a member of the Västerås Juniors in his home country of Sweden for three years.  He was drafted in the 4th round (104th overall) of the 2004 NHL Entry Draft to the Dallas Stars.  Jeff Twohey, the general manager of the Peterborough Petes of the OHL, saw great potential in Näslund as a player.  He had the 6'4", 210-pound Swedish winger drafted in the first round of the 2005 CHL Import Draft.

Näslund's acclimatization to the North American style of hockey helped the Peterborough Petes in their obtainment of the Ontario Hockey League championship in 2006, in the team's 50th anniversary.  He played on a line with Philadelphia Flyers prospect Steve Downie and with OHL superstar Jordan Staal.  The big European rookie was one of two imports on the Petes that season, along with Czech Republic native Lubomír Štach, a defenceman who was traded to the Petes from the Guelph Storm.

Other than Oshawa Generals free agent Nathaniel Brooks (who was signed out of Tier II) and Justin Sawyer (who could not qualify due to playing ten games during the 2004/2005 season), Näslund was the oldest rookie in the OHL last year.

He returned to Sweden the next season.

Career statistics

Regular season and playoffs

International

External links

1986 births
Dallas Stars draft picks
Living people
Nyköpings Hockey players
Peterborough Petes (ice hockey) players
Swedish ice hockey left wingers